Trill Entertainment Presents: All or Nothing is the second compilation album by American hip hop record label Trill Entertainment. It was released on November 9, 2010, by Trill Entertainment, Asylum Records, Warner Bros. Records. This is a contributing album from the record company, which has been discovered by the founders on this label titling as Trill Fam with Lil Boosie, Foxx and Webbie.

Singles
The album's lead single "My People" performed by an American rapper Webbie, was released on August 14, 2010.
"Turn the Beat Up" performed by Trill Fam, was released as the album's second single on September 24, 2010.

Track listing

References

Hip hop compilation albums
2010 compilation albums
Trill Entertainment compilation albums
Lil Boosie albums
Record label compilation albums